This is a list of all flexible-winged aircraft, or aircraft which do not use rigid lifting surfaces (all of them hang gliders except the Antonov).

 Swedish Aerosport Mosquito
 Flylight Doodle Bug
 Pegasus Booster
 Antonov T-2M Maverick
 A-I-R Atos
 A-I-R Atos C 135
 A-I-R Atos C 160
 A-I-R Atos C Classique 135
 A-I-R Atos C Classique 160
 A-I-R Atos C+ 135
 A-I-R Atos C+ 160
 A-I-R Atos VS
 A-I-R Atos V
 A-I-R Atos V
 A-I-R Atos VQ
 A-I-R Atos VR/VR10
 A-I-R Atos VX

Finsterwalder

(Finsterwalder GmbH, Munich, Germany)
Finsterwalder Airfex
Finsterwalder Bergfex
Finsterwalder Funfex
Finsterwalder Jetfex
Finsterwalder Lightfex
Finsterwalder Minifex
Finsterwalder Perfex
Finsterwalder Skyfex
Finsterwalder Speedfex
Finsterwalder Superfex
Finsterwalder Topfex
Finsterwalder Windfex

Flexible-winged